or matcha ice (抹茶アイス Matcha aisu) is an ice cream flavor popular in Japan and other parts of East Asia. Green tea ice cream is also sold in monaka form. It has been available in the United States since the late-1970s, primarily in Japanese restaurants and markets, but is currently moving into mainstream availability.

Background
There is a clear indication that Mount Fuji-shaped green tea ice cream was an item on the menu at the royal dinner party during the Meiji period (1868–1912). The true origin of green tea ice cream, however, is unknown. Although green tea itself seems to have existed as local handmade ice cream at some districts in Japan, none of the Japanese flavored ice creams were merchandised until the 1990s because the major Japanese ice cream manufacturers were producing vanilla, strawberry and chocolate. However, green tea shaved ice  has been well known and popular in Japan long before green tea ice cream.

The amount of imported ice cream increased in the Japanese market after the import liberalization act of ice cream in 1990. Sales of green tea ice cream in Japan began with the importation of green tea ice cream from Maeda-en USA in California with the catchphrase "Pure Japanese style made from California". It has been produced since April 1995, using fresh California milk made in United States The same product was soon imported and distributed to convenience stores and supermarkets in Japan as well and it was introduced in some Japanese newspapers.

During a certain period of the 1980s in Japan, Meiji Dairies started selling its green tea ice cream with Lady Borden Brand but eventually discontinued selling the product.

Häagen-Dazs Japan started producing green tea ice cream in 1996. The product is now sold in Japanese grocery markets and has become one of the company's most popular flavours.

Statistics from the Japanese Ice Cream Association show that green tea ice cream was ranked third in the "Favourite Ice Cream Flavour" study.

In order to prevent a change in color to green tea ice cream (catechin) from sunlight, some containers have lids with an opaque underside. Some green tea ice cream is artificially-colored, and others have natural green coloring from the catechin present in green tea.

Popularity

Green tea ice cream has been available in the United States, the country with the largest ice cream consumption, since the late 1970s, primarily in Japanese restaurants and markets. It is becoming mainstream and can also be made at home.

The U.S. saw rapid growth in Japanese cuisine and sushi popularity in the mid-1990s, which resulted in a big expansion of the Japanese restaurant business in the U.S. This development gradually helped people learn about green tea, resulting in green tea ice cream becoming a typical dessert.

With other dishes
Green tea ice cream could easily be integrated into various decorations and arrangements with other ice cream flavors.

See also

List of Japanese teas
 List of ice cream flavors

References

External links

Flavors of ice cream
ice cream
Japanese desserts and sweets